is a train station in the city of Matsumoto, Nagano Prefecture, Japan, operated by East Japan Railway Company (JR East)., with a freight terminal operated by the Japan Freight Railway Company.

Lines

Station layout
The station consists of one ground-level island platform, connected to the station building by a footbridge. The station has a  Midori no Madoguchi staffed ticket office.

Platforms

History
Minami-Matumoto Station opened on 1 September 1944. With the privatization of Japanese National Railways (JNR) on 1 April 1987, the station came under the control of JR East.

Passenger statistics
In fiscal 2015, the station was used by an average of 1584 passengers daily (boarding passengers only).

Surrounding area
Minami-Matsumoto Post Office

See also
 List of railway stations in Japan

References

External links

 JR East station information 

Railway stations in Matsumoto City
Railway stations in Japan opened in 1944
Stations of East Japan Railway Company
Stations of Japan Freight Railway Company
Shinonoi Line